Horkeliella is a small genus of two species of flowering plants in the rose family known as false horkelias. They are both endemic to California. These wildflowers were named after the genus Horkelia due to their resemblance, but are different enough to maintain a separate genus from the horkelias. They have leaves made up of small, overlapping, toothed leaflets and inflorescences of white or pinkish flowers which are similar in appearance to horkelias.

Congdon's false horkelia (Horkeliella congdonis) is native to the sagebrush slopes of the eastern Sierra Nevada. Purple false horkelia (Horkeliella purpurascens) is found mainly on the western slopes.

External links
Jepson Manual Treatment
USDA Plants Profile
Photo gallery: H. congdonis
Photo gallery: H. purpurascens

Potentilleae
Rosaceae genera
Flora of California